KPSP may refer to:

 Kowloon Park Swimming Pool in Hong Kong
 KPSP-CD, a Class-A low-power digital television station (channel 18, virtual 38) licensed to Cathedral City, California, United States
 The ICAO for Palm Springs International Airport